In enzymology, a tryptophan dehydrogenase is an enzyme that catalyzes the chemical reaction

L-tryptophan + NAD(P)+ + H2O  (indol-3-yl)pyruvate + NH3 + NAD(P)H + H+

The 4 substrates of this enzyme are L-tryptophan, NAD+, NADP+, and H2O, whereas its 5 products are (indol-3-yl)pyruvate, NH3, NADH, NADPH, and H+.

This enzyme belongs to the family of oxidoreductases, specifically those acting on the CH-NH2 group of donors with NAD+ or NADP+ as acceptor.  The systematic name of this enzyme class is L-tryptophan:NAD(P)+ oxidoreductase (deaminating). Other names in common use include NAD(P)+-L-tryptophan dehydrogenase, L-tryptophan dehydrogenase, L-Trp-dehydrogenase, and TDH.  This enzyme has at least one effector, calcium.

References

 

EC 1.4.1
NADPH-dependent enzymes
NADH-dependent enzymes
Enzymes of unknown structure